The Poljica Statute is the most important historical source for the Republic of Poljica. The statute determined the law of Poljica, which is, by its form, style, content and establishment of social-economic relations, totally different from the rest of Croatian statutes.

It is written in short, picturesque sentences that include the norms of Poljica's society from those regarding the highest political authorities to those that include all Poljicians' interests. Besides the laws written in this statute, the Poljica Statute also contains various decisions and verdicts of authority that, in a few occasions, refer to individuals.

The Poljica Statute was changed as the society of Poljica changed. Another important value of the Poljica Statute is its archaic form, which can be used to study the people from Poljica and those from Croatia in general at the time it was formulated. Typical features of the Poljica Statute are guarantees of freedom but also acceptance of responsibility to protect Poljica.

Basic features
The Poljica Statute is a document of priceless value. Besides matters of law, it is useful to study historical, economical, political and other social relations from that time. The Poljica Statute was the result of the wish of the people of Poljica for stronger independence from the Kingdom of Croatia and the Republic of Venice. For that time, the Poljica Statute shows a great level of legal professionalism and consciousness of society. 

The Poljica Statute had various redactions. All redactions occurred at turning points when the Republic of Poljica needed to recognize a new ruler. In the time of the House of Šubić, Poljicians had no need for a statute because they had common interests and goals. The first redaction occurred in 1322 when 18 articles were written which referred to Charles I of Hungary, but he did not accept the statute. This was also confirmed by the charter of Queen Elisabeth of Poland in 1333 in which she mentioned the Poljica Statute.

The second redaction in 1387 was approved by King Tvrtko I of Bosnia. Several variants were later made from this redaction. In 1444, a third redaction was made for the new ruler, the Republic of Venice. In 1485, a fourth redaction was made. This redaction had many changes and additions, and it was created in the time of the personal union between Hungary and Croatia. From all those redactions, it can be seen that some new laws were created, some were repeated, and some were scattered on various places.

The law of Poljica was based on collective laws of Croatia and was influenced by church, feudal, Roman and commercial law. In the Poljica Statute, a clear difference was made between public and individual rights. Public rights were manifested in the relations between serfs and their masters and in the impossibility for citizens to be elected to the Table of Poljica (the government). 

The Statute had little influence on citizens, because they had village autonomy inside of their districts, so they had, through their village princes, an influence on election of new princes, and there were almost no serfs. Laws for serfs were very strict, and for some violations commoners were more severely punished than nobles. For example, if a tenant cursed his landlord his tongue was cut out, and if he dared to rise a hand against him, his right arm would be chopped off.

Redactions
The earliest redaction from the 13th century Poljica Statute is written in Cyrillic (Bosančica) under influence of Glagolitic script.

Language
The language of the redactions is a mixture of steadily receding Čakavian dialect and increasingly mode widespread Štokavian dialect (specifically Western Ikavian) and, given that Glagolite clergymen contributed to the text, a considerable number of Church Slavonicisms are present. In the statute and other public and private documents from Poljica both the script and language are called as Croatian.

See also
Republic of Poljica

References

External links
Poljica Statute (English translation)
Poljica Statute is of priceless value

1440 in Europe
1440s in law
15th century in Croatia
Croatian culture
Medieval documents of Croatia
Legal history of Croatia
Medieval legal codes
Old Croatian inscriptions
Bosnian Cyrillic texts